Minuscule 818 (in the Gregory-Aland numbering), Θε419 (von Soden), is a 14th-century Greek minuscule manuscript of the New Testament written on paper, with a commentary.

Description 
The codex contains the complete text of the four Gospels, on 373 cotton paper leaves (size ), with a commentary. The leaves are arranged in quarto (four leaves in quire). It has ornamented headpieces.

The text is written in one column per page, 32 lines per page.

It contains a commentary of Theophylact.

Text 
The Greek text of the codex is a representative of the Byzantine text-type. Aland placed it in Category V.

It was not examined according to the Claremont Profile Method.

History 

Emmanuel Miller and C. R. Gregory dated the manuscript to the 14th century. It is presently assigned to the 14th century on palaeographic grounds by the Institute for New Testament Textual Research.

The manuscript was briefly described by Emmanuel Miller in 1848. It was added to the list of New Testament manuscripts by Gregory (818e).

The manuscript is now housed in El Escorial (Ψ. III, 13).

See also 

 List of New Testament minuscules
 Biblical manuscript
 Textual criticism
 Minuscule 226

References

Further reading 

 Emmanuel Miller, Catalogue des manuscrits grecs de la bibliothèque de l'Escurial (Paris 1848), p. 436.
 

Greek New Testament minuscules
14th-century biblical manuscripts